Cardell is both a given name and a surname. Notable people with the name include:

Cardell Butler, AKA "Ballaholic", American streetball player
Cardell Camper (born 1952), former Major League Baseball pitcher who played for one season
Cardis Cardell Willis, influential Milwaukee comic
Charles Cardell (1892–1977), English witch who had an influence on the modern neopagan religion of Wicca
Christian Cardell Corbet (born 1976), Canadian painter, sculptor and designer

A cardell was a type of cot bed used in southern Africa in the nineteenth century.

See also
Florence Cardell-Oliver (1876–1965), Western Australian politician and political activist
Cardel (disambiguation)

References